The Calgary Tower is a  free standing observation tower in the downtown core of Calgary, Alberta, Canada. Originally called the Husky Tower, it was conceived as a joint venture between Marathon Realty Company Limited and Husky Oil as part of an urban renewal plan and to celebrate Canada's centennial of 1967. It opened to the public on June 30, 1968 as the tallest structure in Calgary, and the tallest in Canada outside Toronto. It was renamed the Calgary Tower in 1971.

The building was a founding member of the World Federation of Great Towers.

History

Planning and construction
The project was originally conceived as a joint venture by Marathon Realty (the real estate subsidiary of Canadian Pacific Railways) and Husky Oil for their new head offices in Calgary. They proposed building the tower both to honor Canada's centennial year of 1967 and to encourage urban renewal and growth of downtown Calgary.

The urban renewal project was announced to the public on December 10, 1965 and consisted of a transport terminal, hotel, parking, office facility and a 550 foot "restaurant-observation tower". The chosen site housed Canadian Pacific's Calgary passenger station which was demolished a year after the announcement to make way for the development. The provincial government reviewed the tower proposal for consideration as a publicly funded centennial project, but Public Works Minister Frederick C. Colborne recommended against the use of public funds for the project. The concept of a centennial tower was originally proposed for Edmonton, but the project was opposed by residents near the chosen site. Former Calgary Mayor Grant MacEwan asked the provincial government to move the project to Calgary, until Marathon and Husky decided to build the project independent of public funds. The plan for the tower continued to change as construction delays occurred and the planned height rose from 550 feet to 600 feet.

The column of the tower was built from an unprecedented continual pour of concrete.

It dominated the Calgary skyline, standing well over twice the height of the previous tallest structure in the city, Elveden House. Developers deliberately misled the public, claiming the tower would stand , in the hopes of preventing competing developers from surpassing the Husky Tower's height record. Shortly after officials in San Antonio, Texas attempted to claim the record in announcing the completion of the  Tower of the Americas, developers revealed the Husky Tower's true height.

The Husky Tower officially opened on June 28–30, 1968, in three separate ceremonies. The observation level featured a lounge/restaurant called the Hitching Post.

Later history

Marathon Realty acquired a controlling interest in the tower in 1970. The structure was formally renamed the Calgary Tower on November 1, 1971 as a tribute to the citizens of the city. It is still called the Husky Tower by airport officials, however, to distinguish it from the tower at the Calgary International Airport.

The Petro-Canada Centre's west tower overtook the Calgary Tower as the tallest structure in Calgary in 1983.

The tower underwent significant renovations between 1987 and 1990. The addition of a souvenir shop and a revolving restaurant were part of a $2.4 million refurbishment of the upper levels of the tower. In 1990 a glass rotunda to serve as the new lobby was added.

A natural gas-fired cauldron was constructed at the top of the tower by Canadian Western Natural Gas in October 1987 as a gift to celebrate the 1988 Winter Olympics. It continues to be reignited for various special events, including Canada Day.

The tower was a founding member of the World Federation of Great Towers in 1989 along with the Eiffel Tower, among others. It celebrated its 25th anniversary in 1993, a year in which it topped 500,000 visitors for the first time.

A glass floor extension was constructed on the north side of the tower's observation deck and opened on June 24, 2005. When standing on the glass, one can look straight down on 9th Avenue South and Centre Street.

An LED, multicolour exterior lighting system was added and was first tested on August 1, 2014. 12 lights were added to the crown and 24 to the exterior floor. Each light has been programmed to be able to create over 16.5 million combinations of colour and lighting effects. It has been used since October 8, 2014, becoming a more noticeable part of the city skyline at night.

Architecture

The Calgary tower features a revolving restaurant, Sky 360, that rotates so as to give customers a scenic view of downtown Calgary. The restaurant does a complete rotation every 45 minutes during the day and every 60 minutes in the evening. The base of the tower is connected through the +15 skyway network to One Palliser Square, Fairmont Palliser Hotel and EnCana Place. Stairs to the observation deck are not opened to the public, but have been used on occasions for publicity, as well as for an annual charity stair-climbing race. There are 802 steps.

The Vertigo Theatre, founded in 1976 originally as Pleiades Theatre, is located at the base of the tower. They have been entertaining the city from their location in the Calgary Tower since 2003, providing a full season of plays in the mystery genre, for adult and youth audiences.

The tower also features a carillon that was presented to the city by the local Dutch community in 1975 as part of the city's centennial celebrations. It was played daily at noon until removed in 1987 for storage. The carillon has since been refurbished and restored to operation.

It is similar in design to the Skylon Tower in Niagara Falls, Ontario.

Gallery

References

External links 

Video from top of Calgary Tower

Buildings and structures in Calgary
Historic buildings in Calgary
Modernist architecture in Canada
Observation towers in Canada
Tourist attractions in Calgary
Towers completed in 1968
Towers in Alberta
Towers with revolving restaurants
1968 establishments in Alberta